The 2000 Cincinnati Masters was a men's tennis tournament and the 99th edition of the event previously known as the Great American Insurance ATP Championships. The tournament was part of the Tennis Masters Series of the 2000 ATP Tour.  It took place in Mason, Ohio, United States, from August 7 through August 14, 2000. Thomas Enqvist won the singles title.

The tournament previously appeared on the Tier III of the WTA Tour; no event was held from 1989 to 2003.

Finals

Singles

 Thomas Enqvist defeated  Tim Henman, 7–6(7–5), 6–4
It was Thomas Enqvist's 1st title of the year and his 17th overall. It was his 1st Masters title of the year and his 3rd overall.

Doubles

 Mark Woodforde /  Todd Woodbridge defeated  Ellis Ferreira /  Rick Leach  7–6(8–6), 6–4

References

External links
 
 ATP tournament profile

 
Cincinnati Masters
Cincinnati Masters
Cincinnati Masters
2000 in sports in Ohio